itsu is a British chain of East Asian-inspired fast food shops and restaurants and a grocery company. The company offers franchises.

History 
The chain was founded by Julian Metcalfe, co-founder of sandwich chain Pret a Manger, in partnership with Clive Schlee.

Outlets and expansion

The first itsu restaurant opened in Chelsea, London in 1997. In September 2013, itsu opened its first restaurant outside London, in Oxford.

In January 2016, itsu opened its first Northern England restaurant, in Spinningfields, central Manchester. The chain later opened a branch in Leeds.

 itsu had 76 restaurants in England, including 54 in London (44 in February 2023), and one in Brussels Airport, Belgium.

In June 2018, the company opened a branch in Midtown Manhattan, New York City, US. In February 2023 itsu's Web site listed Brussels and Paris as the only non-UK locations; the US Web page was dead.

itsu [grocery]
In March 2012, Metcalfe's Food Company, run by Robert Jakobi, launched the itsu brand into retail under the name itsu [grocery].

Partnerships
In January 2014, itsu became the official partner of the Volleyball England Beach Tour, but was not listed on the UKBT Web site as of 2021.

References

External links
 Official website
 itsu Grocery website

Restaurants in London
Asian restaurants in the United Kingdom
Restaurants established in 1997